On 27 November 2000, ten-year-old Nigerian schoolboy Damilola Taylor was killed in London, in what became one of the United Kingdom's most high-profile killings. Two brothers who were 12 and 13 at the time of the killing were convicted of manslaughter in 2006.

Damilola Taylor

Damilola Olufemi Taylor was born in Lagos, Nigeria to Richard and Gloria Taylor, both from the Yoruba ethnic group. He attended Wisdom Montessori School in Ikosi, Ketu, Lagos before he travelled to the United Kingdom in August 2000 with his family to seek treatment for his sister's epilepsy.

Death

On 27 November 2000, Taylor set off from Peckham Library, south east London, at 4:51 pm to walk home. He was captured on CCTV as he walked away. On approaching the North Peckham Estate he received a gash to his left thigh, severing an artery. Staggering to a stairwell, he collapsed and bled to near death in approximately 30 minutes. He was still alive in an ambulance on his way to hospital. He died 10 days before his 11th birthday.

Trials

First trial
In 2002, four youths, including two 16-year-old brothers, went on trial at the Old Bailey for the murder of Taylor. The trial led to all four suspects being acquitted. Two were acquitted on the direction of the judge after he ruled that the prosecution's key witness, a 14-year-old girl, was unreliable; the jury found the other two not guilty. As well as questioning the reliability of the witness, the defence presented expert witness testimony from Alastair Wilson, associate clinical director at the Royal London Hospital and one of Britain's top trauma experts, that Taylor's wounds were consistent with his falling on a broken bottle whilst being attacked. This was disputed by the prosecution, who argued that Taylor would have had to "take off and fly through the air like Peter Pan" in order for Wilson's theory to be correct. Wilson also admitted that "he had not seen Damilola's body or been given other information about the death." Pathologist Dr. Vesna Djurovic maintained that Taylor "was stabbed deliberately [with a broken bottle] in the left thigh, probably while he was on the ground."

New evidence
Despite the setback, police vowed to keep the investigation open. New DNA techniques employed by Angela Gallop and her team identified Taylor's blood on the trainers of Daniel Preddie and on the sweatshirt cuff of his brother Richard Preddie, neither of whom were among the four original suspects. This led to a re-examination of the evidence obtained at the time of Taylor's death. In 2005, fresh arrests were made, resulting in Hassan Jihad, 19, and the Preddie brothers, aged 16 and 17, being charged with manslaughter. Due to their age, the Preddie brothers were not publicly named at the time of their arrest or during their trial.

Second trial
On 23 January 2006, Jihad (now 21 years old) and the Preddie brothers (now 17 and 18 years old) appeared at the Old Bailey to face charges of his manslaughter and assault before the start of their imminent trial. The trial commenced on 24 January 2006. Alastair Wilson again testified that he thought that Taylor had died after falling on a shard of glass from a broken bottle. After retiring on 29 March to consider its verdict, on 3 April the jury cleared Jihad of all charges in relation to Taylor's death. They were unable to reach a verdict on the charges of manslaughter against the two brothers, so they were released, but with the possibility of a retrial on those charges.

Retrial for manslaughter
The retrial of the two brothers began on 23 June. The two brothers, then over 18, were named as Danny and Ricky Preddie, of Peckham, south London. Both defendants were very well known to police, having committed multiple robberies.

On 9 August 2006, Ricky Gavin Preddie (born 1987, Lambeth, London) and Danny Charles Preddie (born 1988, Lambeth), after a 33-day retrial, were convicted of the manslaughter of Taylor.

During the retrial it was noted that, while the police did follow procedure collecting evidence, lapses occurred in the prosecution.

On 9 October 2006, an Old Bailey judge sentenced the Preddie brothers to eight years in youth custody for manslaughter.

Although it was widely reported in the media that Taylor's parents were unhappy that the sentences had not been longer, the judge, Mr Justice Goldring, went to some lengths to explain the factors he was forced to take into account. These included the age of the offenders at the time (12 and 13), and that there was no evidence to suggest that there had been a plan to kill Taylor. In addition, the bottle used had not been carried to the scene of the crime.

Both brothers were set to be paroled in 2010 after serving half of their sentence. Ricky was released on 8 September 2010, subject to probation supervision, and subject to recall to custody if he breached the conditions or if his behaviour indicated that it was no longer safe to allow him to remain in the community. Danny was released in 2011. Ricky was recalled on 13 March 2011 because he was seen in Peckham, and for associating with gang members, both contrary to his parole conditions. He was released again on 25 January 2012. He was again recalled to prison sixteen days later, in February 2012, after again associating with gang members in Peckham, in breach of the terms of his release. Taylor's father called for a public inquiry into the handling of the case. Ricky Preddie was released again in July 2012.

Aftermath
In February 2020 Ricky Preddie (also known as Ricky Johnson) was again jailed. He had driven his car at a police officer, leaving her with serious injuries.  Preddie pleaded guilty to causing serious injury by dangerous driving; driving whilst disqualified; failing to stop; and driving without insurance. He was imprisoned for four years for the crimes.

In popular culture
Children's author Beverley Naidoo recalled how when she went to accept the Smarties Silver Award for her book The Other Side of Truth (2000), about two Nigerian child refugees, she heard the news of Taylor's death. As a result, she organised an ongoing donation of 10p to the Refugee Council from every book sold.

Writer Stephen Kelman was nominated for the 2011 Man Booker Prize for his debut novel Pigeon English, inspired in part by the Taylor killing.

Actor John Boyega and his sister Grace were among the last people to see Taylor alive. They were friends and the Boyegas helped watch him.

The BBC programme Panorama aired a special on the death of Damilola Taylor in April 2002. A 90-minute BBC dramatisation of the events leading to his death and his family's search for justice, Damilola, Our Loved Boy, premiered in November 2016 and won the BAFTA Award for a single drama.

In Black History Month 2020, Capital XTRA presenter Yinka Bokinni, also a playmate of Damilola Taylor,  hosted a documentary about him for Channel 4 titled Damilola: The Boy Next Door.

See also
 Timeline of children's rights in the United Kingdom

References

Citations

 
 
 About King's College London : News and What's On : King's College London

External links
 Damilola Taylor Trust

2000 crimes in the United Kingdom
2000 in London
2000s crimes in London
2000s trials
20th century in the London Borough of Southwark
Deaths by person in London
Manslaughter trials
Murder trials
November 2000 crimes
November 2000 events in the United Kingdom
Peckham
Trials in London
Knife attacks
Residents of Lagos